Atlantic City Football Club (ACFC) is an American soccer team based in  Atlantic City, New Jersey, United States. Founded in 2017, the team plays in the NPSL .  The team uses Stockton University's Soccer Stadium in Galloway for home matches. The team's colors are purple, black and white.

History
ACFC was officially announced as an expansion side in the NPSL on December 21, 2017.” Shortly after, former Swansea City player Kristian O'Leary was appointed Head Coach. The team played its first season at Stockton University. 

On February 7, 2019 it was announced that the team is working with The City of Atlantic City to play home games in Surf Stadium starting in 2020.

Records

Year-by-year

Honours
The club has yet to win any competitive honors.

Players

Coaching Staff

Club Officials

References 

Soccer clubs in New Jersey
Cosmopolitan Soccer League
American Soccer League (2014–2017) teams
National Premier Soccer League teams
Sports in Atlantic City, New Jersey
2017 establishments in New Jersey
Association football clubs established in 2017